Teresa Cabre may refer to:

 Maria Teresa Cabré (born 1947), Spanish linguist
 Teddie Gerard ( Teresa Cabre, 1890-1942), Argentine film actress and entertainer